Kohraa (The Fog) is a 1964 Indian thriller horror film directed by Biren Nag, starring Waheeda Rehman, Biswajeet and Lalita Pawar. The film was adapted from Daphne du Maurier's 1938 novel Rebecca, which was previously adapted by Alfred Hitchcock as Academy Award-winning Rebecca (1940), though some supernatural elements were added to it, including a few from the movie Psycho. This version is famous for its twist ending, which differs significantly from that of the original novel.

Plot
Rajeshwari meets rich Amit Kumar Singh and they both fall in love and get married. Amit brings Rajeshwari to his home - A huge imposing mansion in middle of Moors. Rajeshwari learns from servants about Amit's first wife Poonam who died in mysterious circumstances about a year ago. The housekeeper Dai Maa, who was also the nanny of Poonam is visibly disturbed by this and is cold towards Rajeshwari. Amit leaves on a business trip for a few weeks and Rajeshwari is left to herself. This is when she encounters supernatural phenomena in the mansion and is haunted by the memories and spirit of Poonam. Recovering from shock, Rajeshwari decides to do her own investigation of Poonam's mysterious death. One by one she uncovers shocking dark secrets about Poonam, Amit and various other people.

Cast
Waheeda Rehman as Rajeshwari Singh
Biswajeet as Raja Amit Kumar Singh
Lalita Pawar as Dai Maa
 Thelma as Poonam Devi
Tarun Bose as Ramesh
Madan Puri as Kamal Rai
Manmohan Krishna as Kamal's Advocate
Asit Sen as Goverdhan
 Badri Prasad 
 Abhi Bhattacharya as Advocate Bhattacharya
 Sujit Kumar as Ranjan
 Shaukat Azmi as Rai Sahib's wife

Productions
The film was the second directorial venture of Biren Nag after the hit film Bees Saal Baad (1962). He had been art director of Guru Dutt productions such as Chaudhvin Ka Chand  (1960), Sahib Bibi Aur Ghulam (1962) and CID (1956). The role of Poonam was played by Thelma, an Anglo-Indian actress, who did small roles in film.

The scene of the first wife's room, an all white set was built at Rajkamal Kalamandir in Mumbai. The song, "Yeh Nayan Dare Dare" was filmed on winding road to Mahabaleshwar, a hill station in Maharashtra.

Music
Music:Hemant Kumar; Lyrics : Kaifi Azmi
"Yeh Nayan Dare Dare"  - Hemant Kumar
"Rah Bani Khud Manzil" - Hemant Kumar
"O Beqarar Dil" - Lata Mangeshkar
"Jhoom Jhoom Dhalti Raat" (version 1) - Lata Mangeshkar 
"Jhoom Jhoom Dhalti Raat" (version 2) - Lata Mangeshkar 
"Kahe Bajayi Tune Paani Bansuriya" - Mahendra Kapoor, Asha Bhosle

Awards
Filmfare Nomination for Best Actress in a Supporting Role - Lalita Pawar
Filmfare Award for Best Art Direction for Black-and-White film category - G. L. Yadhav & T. K. Desai

References

External links 
 
 
 

Works based on Rebecca (novel)
1964 films
1960s psychological thriller films
Indian psychological thriller films
Films based on works by Daphne du Maurier
Films based on British novels
1960s Hindi-language films
Indian black-and-white films
Films scored by Hemant Kumar
Films shot in Maharashtra
Indian mystery films
Films set in country houses
1960s mystery films